Henrietta is a feminine given name, derived from the male name Henry. The name is an English version of the French Henriette, a female form of Henri. A short version of the name is Harriet, which was considered the "spoken form" of Henrietta, much as Harry was considered the "spoken form" of Henry in medieval England.

All these names are derived from Henrik, which is ultimately derived from the Germanic name Heimiric, derived from the word elements heim, or "home" and ric, meaning "power, ruler." The male name Henry was first used in the Kingdom of England by Normans. Henrietta Maria of France, baptized as Henrietta Maria, in Latin, but called in French Henriette-Marie, the queen consort of Charles I of England, first inspired wide use of the name in England in the 17th century. In 2006, an authority on given names noted that Henrietta was one of the most  "thoroughly upper-class names" in use in England.

Henrietta is no longer a widely used name in English-speaking countries, although its shorter form, Harriet, was the 73rd most popular name for baby girls born in England in 2007, and in 2005 Henrietta was the 85th most popular given name for girls born in Hungary, perhaps inspired by the fame of Henrietta Ónodi, a top-ranked Hungarian gymnast. Both Henrietta and Harriet were ranked in the top 1,000 most popular names for girls in the United States during the 1960s. Henrietta was the 446th most common name for females in the United States in the 1990 census.

Royal bearers 

 Henrietta Maria of France (1609–1669), daughter of Henry IV of France, wife of Charles I of England
Henriette Marie, Princess Palatine (1626–1651), daughter of Elizabeth Stuart 
Mary Henrietta, Princess Royal (1631–1660), daughter of Charles I of England and Henrietta Maria
Henrietta Adelaide of Savoy (1636–1927)
 Henrietta Anne, Duchess of Orleans (1644–1670), daughter of Charles I of England and Henrietta Maria
Henrietta Butler, Viscountess Galmoye (1667–1730)
Henriette Louise de Bourbon (1703–1772)
 Princess Henrietta of Nassau-Weilburg (1797–1829), daughter of Frederick William, Prince of Nassau-Weilburg
Queen Marie Henriette of the Belgians (1836–1902), daughter of Archduke Joseph, Palatine of Hungary

Henrietta
 Henrietta Adler (1868–1950), a British Liberal politician 
 Dame Henrietta Barnett (1851–1936), English social reformer and author
 Dame Henrietta Barnett (1905–1985), a British air force officer
 Henrietta Batson (1859–1943), English writer 
 Henrietta Beaufort (1778–1865), Anglo-French botanist born in Ireland
 Henrietta A. Bingham (1841–1877), American writer
 Henrietta Bingham (1901–1968), American journalist, newspaper executive and horse breeder
 Henrietta Baker Chanfrau (1837–1909), American actress
 Henrietta Buckmaster (1909–1983), American journalist and author 
 Henrietta Doran-York (born 1962), Minister Plenipotentiary of Sint Maarten
 Henrietta H. Fore (born 1948), UNICEF official
 Henrietta Garnett (1945–2019), English writer 
 Henrietta Hooker (1851–1929), American botanist
 Henrietta Lacks (1920–1951), American woman who was the source of the HeLa cell line
 Henrietta Swan Leavitt (1868–1921), American astronomer
 Henrietta Amelia Leeson (1751–1826), English actress 
 Henrietta Liston (1752–1828), British botanist born in Antigua 
 Henrietta Godolphin, 2nd Duchess of Marlborough (1681–1733), daughter and heiress of 1st Duke of Marlborough 
 Henrietta Barclay Paist (1870–1930), American artist and author
 Henrietta Bentinck, Duchess of Portland (1774–1844), wife of William Bentinck, 4th Duke of Portland
 Henrietta Consuelo Sansom, Countess of Quigini Puliga (1847-1938), French writer
 Henrietta Skelton (c. 1840–1900), German-born Canadian-American social reformer
 Henrietta Szold (1860–1945), American Zionist leader and founder of Hadassah
 Henrietta Tayler known as Hetty (1869 – 1951), London born Jacobite scholar and First World War nurse

Henriette
 Henriette Löfman (1784–1836) Swedish composer
 Henriette Nissen-Saloman (1819–1879), Swedish opera singer
 Henriette Pressburg (1788–1863), mother of Karl Marx
 Henriette Reker (born 1956), German politician and first woman to be mayor of Cologne 
 Henriette Widerberg (1796–1872), Swedish opera singer
 Henriette Wienecke Stadfeldt (1819–1907), Norwegian-Danish composer

See also
Harriet (name)

Versions of the name
Endika (Basque)
Enrica (Italian)
Enriqueta (Spanish)
Erietta (Greek)
Etta (English)
Etti (English)
Ettie (English)
Etty (English)
Haliaka (Hawaiian)
Halle (English)
Hallie (English)
Hariala (Hawaiian)
Hariata (Hawaiian)
Harrieta (English)
Harriett (English)
Harrietta (English)
Harriette (English)
Harriot (English)
Harriott (English)
Hat (English)
Hatt (English)
Hatsy (English)
Hatti (English)
Hattie (English)
Hatty (English)
Heike (Dutch), (Frisian), (German)
Heinrike (German)
Heintje (Dutch)
Hendrika (Dutch)
Hendrikje (Dutch)
Henka (Polish)
Henna (Finnish)
Henni (English)
Hennie (Dutch), (English)
Henny (Dutch), (English)
Henrieta (Polish)
Henrietta (English)
Henriette (Danish), (Dutch), (French), (German), (Norwegian)
Henriikka (Finnish) 
Henrika (Swedish)
Henrike (German), (Scandinavian)
Henriqueta (Portuguese)
Henryka (Polish)
Hetta (English)
Hetti (English)
Hettie (English)
Hetty (English)
Jet (Dutch)
Jett (Dutch)
Jetje (Dutch), 
Jindřiška (Czech) 
Rika (Dutch), (Swedish)
Rike (German)
Riikka (Finnish)
Yetta (English)
Yettie (English)
Yetty (English)
Heni (Hungarian)

Notes

References
Rosenkrantz, Linda and Satran, Pamela Redmond (2006). Beyond Jennifer and Jason, Madison and Montana. St. Martin's Press. 

Feminine given names
English given names
English feminine given names
Henrietta Maria